Stenoma syngraphopis is a moth in the family Depressariidae. It was described by Edward Meyrick in 1930. It is found in Pará, Brazil.

The wingspan is 15–19 mm. The forewings are ochreous whitish slightly grey sprinkled in the disc and posteriorly. There is a small dark fuscous dot on the base of the costa and a slender curved dark fuscous streak from the base in the middle to the angle of a dark fuscous trapezoidal spot on the middle of the dorsum, the fold sometimes suffused fuscous above this. The discal stigmata are small, cloudy and dark fuscous, beneath the second an additional dot, towards which are directed slender suffused dark fuscous streaks from the posterior angle of the median dorsal spot, and from a triangular dark fuscous or brownish tornal spot, the dorsal area between these forming a pale-edged blotch of obscure light red-brownish suffusion. There is a slender irregular zigzag grey streak from the middle of the costa towards the second discal stigma and a marginal series of small blackish-grey interneural spots around the posterior part of the costa and termen to before the tornus. The hindwings are pale grey.

References

Moths described in 1930
Taxa named by Edward Meyrick
Stenoma